Gabi Rosendoren (30 October 1947 – 27 April 1980) was an Israeli footballer who played for the national team of Israel and also played in the local top division for 12 seasons with Hapoel Petah Tikva, Maccabi Netanya and Hapoel Yehud.

Honours
Championships
1977–78
State Cup
1977–78
Israeli Supercup
1978
UEFA Intertoto Cup
1978

References

1947 births
1980 deaths
20th-century Israeli Jews
Israeli footballers
Israel international footballers
Hapoel Herzliya F.C. players
Hapoel Petah Tikva F.C. players
Maccabi Netanya F.C. players
Liga Leumit players
Association football midfielders